Sea Ports Corporation is an independent state corporation of Sudan that governs, constructs and maintains the ports, harbors and lighthouses of Sudan.  The company was founded in 1974 by the government of Sudan to be the national port operator and port authority.

Ports
Sea Ports Corporation operates and governs the following ports of Sudan:

Port Sudan
The Port of Port Sudan in Red Sea State is composed of three ports: the Northern Port, which handles petroleum products, containers and bulk grain; the Southern Port, handling edible oils, molasses, cement; and Green Harbor on the east side of Port Sudan, which handles dry bulk cargo, seeds and containers.

Al Khair
The Al Khair Petroleum Terminal was completed in 2003, at Port Sudan.

Osman Digna
The Port of Prince Osman Digna at Suakin has three berths serving cargo ships and passenger ships, and a liquefied petroleum gas terminal. With a length of 100.40 meters, next to the arrival hall, it is designated for ship agents to store passengers' luggage, and often cruises and passenger ships to and from the Kingdom of Saudi Arabia.

El Zubir
The Marshal Alzubeer Mohammed Salih Port at the junction of Lake Nasser and the Nile River at Wadi Halfa was rehabilitated, and commissioned in 2001.

See also
 Red Sea
 Transport in Sudan
 Port authority
 Port operator

References

External links
Sea Ports Corporation official site

Government agencies of Sudan
Transport companies of Sudan
Sudan
Sudan
Ports and harbours in Africa
Port Sudan
Red Sea
1974 establishments in Sudan